Miguel Cordero (born 10 November 1971) is a Venezuelan former association footballer who played as a defender.

Career
Cordero played club football for Portuguesa and Marítimo.

He made one international appearance for Venezuela in 1993.

References

1971 births
Living people
Venezuelan footballers
Venezuela international footballers
Portuguesa F.C. players
C.S. Marítimo de Venezuela players
Association football defenders
20th-century Venezuelan people
21st-century Venezuelan people